Saint-Lary is the name of two communes in France:

 Saint-Lary, Ariège in the Ariège department
 Saint-Lary, Gers, in the Gers department